Nikaido (written: 二階堂) may refer to:

 Nikaidō clan, a family of Japanese daimyō
 Nikaidō, an administrative division of the city of Kamakura, Japan

People with the surname
, Japanese politician
, Japanese economist
, Japanese actress
, Japanese singer
, Japanese singer; see Good Ikuze!

Japanese-language surnames